Hillside, also known as the Julian Price House, is a historic mansion located in the Fisher Park neighborhood of Greensboro, Guilford County, North Carolina. It was designed by architect Charles C. Hartmann and built in 1929 for the businessman Julian Price and his wife, Ethel Clay Price. It has a three-story polygonal stair tower, red-brown rough fired brick, and half-timbering with tan stucco. Also on the property is a contributing rustic board-and-batten gardener's cottage.

It was listed on the National Register of Historic Places in 1980.  It is located in the Fisher Park Historic District.

In January 2017, Sandra Cowart, an interior designer and former owner of the home, was featured on an episode of A&E's Hoarders. Cowart, who lived there since 1975, was an expert on the home and its architecture. She  kept the home in pristine condition until her husband left her in 1979, after she refused to sell the home and have it demolished. For many years, she rented out rooms in the mansion, and gave frequent tours. Her family stated that after 2005, she rarely let anyone inside. She became a compulsive collector, and ultimately lost her business, forcing her to partake in several refinancing schemes that ultimately led to the home being foreclosed. The new owners were understanding, and allowed her to sell and dispose of her things. When asked how she felt about being forced to move, Cowart said she is "lucky" to have called Hillside home for 40 years, and hoped the new owners enjoyed it.

Eric and Michael Fuko-Rizzo purchased Hillside in September, 2016, in a foreclosure sale. After the house was cleared of Cowart's possessions in late 2016, the Fuko-Rizzos refurbished the interior and grounds over 2017 with the assistance of Preservation Greensboro, landscape architect Chip Callaway and the University of North Carolina at Greensboro Department of Interior Architecture, among others. After the house was remodeled, the Fuko-Rizzos invited interior designers to turn the house into a gallery of contemporary interior design. The kitchen and most of the house was fully remodeled. The "designer showcase" was open from April 7, 2018, through April 29, after which the Fuko-Rizzo family occupied the house.

The Greensboro Zoning Commission denied the Fuko-Rizzos' request for a special permit in May 2019. On November 14, 2019, a judge reversed the ruling, allowing Hillside to become a bed and breakfast provided certain conditions are met.

References

Houses on the National Register of Historic Places in North Carolina
Tudor Revival architecture in North Carolina
Houses completed in 1929
Houses in Greensboro, North Carolina
National Register of Historic Places in Guilford County, North Carolina
Historic district contributing properties in North Carolina